Zooplus AG is an online retailer of pet food and supplies with headquarters in Munich, Germany. Founded in 1999, the E-commerce company ships now to 30 countries in Europe and the United Kingdom. After its IPO in 2008, Zooplus is listed at Frankfurt Stock Exchange and a constituent of the SDAX stock market index.

Sales for the first half of 2015 were 344 million euros, up 34% compared with the first half of 2014. The company expected 2015 sales to total at least 725 million Euro.

In the following years, Zooplus continued an upward streak of sales. In fall 2018, Amazon started to sell pet food in Europe under its own brands. Despite the new competitor from the US, Zooplus realised 1,342 million Euro of total sales in 2018. A growth of 21% compared to the previous year.

In August and September 2021, Zooplus was the subject of a bidding war between private equity firms Hellman & Friedman, KKR & Co., and EQT Partners, with the highest bid reaching €470 per share (~€3.36 billion).

References

External links
Official Website (Onlineshop)
Corporate Website (Investor Relations)

Companies listed on the Frankfurt Stock Exchange
Online retailers of Germany
Retail companies established in 1999
Internet properties established in 1999
Pet stores
Companies based in Munich
1999 establishments in Germany